The 1947–1948 season was Burnley's first season in the top tier of English football for 18 years. Under Cliff Britton they finished in 3rd place.

Appearances and goals

|}

Matches

Football League Division One
Key

In Result column, Burnley's score shown first
H = Home match
A = Away match

pen. = Penalty kick
o.g. = Own goal

Results

Final league position

FA Cup

References

Burnley F.C. seasons
Burnley